"Gone Too Far" is an electropop/new wave song performed by Canadian band Dragonette. The song was written and produced by Dragonette for their second album Fixin to Thrill (2009). It serves as the album's second single, following the lead single, "Fixin' to Thrill". The song was released digitally in July 2009, and was later sent to radio in August 2009. "Gone Too Far" had its premiere when the band performed live at the Red Studios in New York City in October 2008. A music video for the song was made by friends of the band, and posted on the video hosting website YouTube.

Lyrically, the song is about a girl who starts out trying to seduce a man on a short-term basis, however, he shows a greater interest and she falls in love with him. The girl is trying to get the man into something much more long-term, but also trying to keep from scaring him off at the same time.

Critical reception
After its premiere in October 2008, some critics expected the song to appear as a B-side, or bonus track, rather than an album track. Aside from being received well by fans, the song received mostly positive reviews from music critics, who favored the track for its 'hillbilly vibe'.

Track listing

Digital Download 
From CD Universe.

References

2009 singles
Dragonette songs
2009 songs
Songs written by Martina Sorbara
Songs written by Dan Kurtz